Barrett Christy is an American snowboarder and Winter Olympics Athlete.  She currently resides in Gig Harbor, Washington.

Christy was a member of the first U.S. Snowboarding team during the 1998 Winter Olympics. She has won more medals than any other female athlete in the Winter X Games, until Lindsey Jacobellis passed her.

History
Christy was born in Buffalo, New York, and grew up in Bucks County, Pennsylvania. She learned to snowboard in 1991 and has been competing since the mid 1990s. She lived in Breckenridge, Colorado from 1991 to 1995, living hand-to-mouth in poverty like a "ski bum". She later moved to upscale Vail after going "Big Time."

Christy's signature move is called the "Barrett Roll".

Media appearances
Christy has been featured in Hardly Angels (2002) and Our Turn (2001), both all-girl snowboard films by White Knuckle Extreme. In 2007, she was featured in the women's snowboard movie Float.

Other work
Christy oversees the design of women's snowboards for Gnu Snowboards, including the Gnu Barret Christy Pro Model (B-Pro), which is the longest-running women's pro model snowboard.

Competition history
 2003 Mt. Baker Banked Slalom - 5th
 2002 Winter X Games - 3rd Slopestyle
 2002 World Championships - 3rd Superpipe
 2001 ESPN Action Sports and Music Awards - Female Snowboarder of the Year
 2001 Mt. Baker Banked Slalom - 1st Pro Women
 2001 Grand Prix in Mammoth and Breckenridge, 1st
 2000 Winter X Games - 2nd Superpipe/ 3rd Slopestyle
 2000 US Open - 3rd Superpipe
 2000 Winter Gravity Games - 3rd Big Air
 2000 Transworld Riders Poll Awards - Best Overall Female Snowboarder
 1999 Transworld Riders Poll Awards - Best Overall Female Snowboarder
 1999 Summer X Games - 1st Big Air, 1999
 1999 Winter X Games - 1st halfpipe / 2nd slopestyle
 1999 Gravity Games, 3rd Big Air
 1998 Winter X Games - 2nd Big Air, 2nd Slopestyle
 1998 Olympic team member, Nagano Japan
 1997 Winter X Games - 1st Big Air, 1st Slopestyle
 1997 US Open - 1st Halfpipe, 1st Big Air
 1997 US Open - 1st in Halfpipe and Big Air
 1994 Amateur National Halfpipe contest, 1st

References

External links
interview in Frequency Snowboard Journal

Year of birth missing (living people)
Living people
American female snowboarders
Olympic snowboarders of the United States
Snowboarders at the 1998 Winter Olympics
People from Gig Harbor, Washington
21st-century American women